The 1998–99 season was the 75th season in the existence of AEK Athens F.C. and the 40th consecutive season in the top flight of Greek football. They competed in the Alpha Ethniki, the Greek Cup and the UEFA Cup. The season began on 22 August 1998 and finished on 30 May 1999.

Overview

The summer started with great ambition for the team, since the owner multinational company ENIC had all the time in front of it to proceed with transfers and build a strong team. The management of Lakis Nikolaou negotiated with big name coaches and got close to sign Joachim Löw, but eventually ended up with the experienced but controversial Dragoslav Stepanović. The important transfer was that of Vasilios Lakis, who was strongly claimed by Olympiacos, Panathinaikos and PAOK and also some other good transfers such as Akis Zikos and Dimitris Markos took place, but the foreign players who came did not amuse and the gap in the defensive line, left after the retirement of the long–time regular and club's captain, Stelios Manolas, was not filled.

AEK started mediocre, while at the same time Dimitris Melissanidis took over the management of the team. Stepanović started well, but it was obvious that he his presence was not convincing and he was finally sacked after the 7th game. Takis Karagiozopoulos took over as caretaker coach for a while and then Oleg Blokhin was hired. AEK finally built a decent team, while in January they were strengthened a lot with the loan moves of Wreh and Méndez from Arsenal within the most important additions. Important victories were the derby against Olympiacos and Panathinaikos in Nikos Goumas Stadium both with a score of 2–0. The 6–0 over Aris and the 6–2 over Panelefsiniakos were the biggest victories. In the end, AEK could not claim the championship from Olympiacos, but they managed to beat Panathinaikos the race to the second place that led to the next season's UEFA Champions League qualifiers.

In the UEFA Cup AEK were drawn against Ferencváros for the second qualifying round. At Stadion Albert Flórián, the yellow-blacks got off to a very nervous start and were swept away by the Magyars' frenetic pace, trailing in the first quarter. The Hungarians score a second goal on the half hour, they go to the locker room with a hopeless 2–0 and everyone with the continuation was as equaly bad, as by the 83rd minute the score became 4–0, turning the game into a real nightmare. AEK pulled off a reaction in the stoppage time and with two goals that allowed them to avoid humiliation, claimed the chances of qualifying in the rematch of Athens. Two weeks later in Nea Filadelfeia, AEK, led by their star, Demis Nikolaidis, went into the game determined and by the 26th minute he scored 3 goals, giving one of his best performances in the AEK shirt. The second half took on a procedural nature after the qualification has been decided and AEK simply puts the "icing on the cake" with a fourth goal in the 65th minute. The first round of the UEFA Cup brought AEK against the Dutch Vitesse, who all Greeks know because of the successful presence of Nikos Machlas. AEK arrived at the GelreDome as the favorite and in the first half controlled the match. Howeber, a very bad second half began with Machla's missed penalty in the 50th minute, which Laros converted into a goal in the restart, while three minutes later the Dutch made it 2–0 and afterwards Kasapis was sent off with a second yellow. Machlas destroyed any hopes of qualification in stoppage time scoring Vitesse's third goal and AEK had their backs against the wall ahead of the rematch. The rematch despite heavy loss was fancied and the fans had faith in the comeback. The Nikos Goumas was almost full, but very quickly Machlas put an end to the qualification debate. Nikolaidis responded with a goal almost immediately, but again Machlas three minutes later gave the Dutch the lead. AEK were again disjointed and after the 3 goals in the first twenty minutes, the game opened up, chances were missed on both sides and despite the dismissal of Westerfeld before the end of the half, Vitesse reached a third goal. AEK avoided defeat in a continuous chase for the score in the second half and tried to even get the win but failed to do so with the match ending in 3–3 draw. In an atmosphere of disappointment and protest for the AEK coach, the team's exit from the European obligations of the season and limited themselves to the domestic ones since too many things changed along the way, both at the competitive and administrative level.

In the Cup, AEK were prematurely knocked out after they suffered a shock defeat in their first game from third–tier club, Poseidon Michaniona, with a terrible performance by the team.

Top scorer of the season for the team in the league was Demis Nikolaidis with 22 goals, while Christos Maladenis scored 13 goals.

Journey to Beligrade

In April 1999 by Dimitris Melissanidis' initiative, a friendly match was organised against Partizan in Belgrade, during the height of the NATO bombing of Serbia. As a gesture of compassion and solidarity towards the embattled Serbs, the AEK players and management staff defied the international embargo and traveled to Belgrade for the match. AEK's staff, alongside many political figures of the time such as Manolis Glezos, arrived in the Serbian capital amid moving events by Serbs offering Greeks bread and salt, a symbol of Serbian hospitality. After a stop at the Presidential Palace, where AEK conveyed the message of support of the Greek people, the team arrived at the Partizan stadium.

About 15,000 fans of both teams were present, despite the fact that all 40,000 tickets that had had been sold. The reason people were less than the sold tickets, was the fuel, as there was a shortage and transportation was very difficult. It was worth noting that this was the first time since the beginning of the war that no sirens were heard during the day. The players of both teams entered the stadium together, holding a banner that read "NATO stop the war, stop the bombing". The game ended 1–1, when at the 68th minute thousands of Serbian football fans invaded the pitch to embrace the footballers. As was normal, this friendly game surpassed the geographical borders of Greece and Yugoslavia, being an object of admiration by the European Press.

Players

Squad information

NOTE: The players are the ones that have been announced by the AEK Athens' press release. No edits should be made unless a player arrival or exit is announced. Updated 30 June 1999, 23:59 UTC+3.

Transfers

In

Summer

Winter

Out

Summer

Winter

Loan in

Summer

Winter

Loan out

Summer

Winter

Notes

 a.  plus Chiotis and Platakis as a free loan until the end of the season.

 b.  exchange of Zouboulis and Machairidis between AEK and PAOK.

Renewals

Overall transfer activity

Expenditure
Summer:  ₯1,060,000,000

Winter:  ₯0

Total:  ₯1,060,000,000

Income
Summer:  ₯0

Winter:  ₯0

Total:  ₯0

Net Totals
Summer:  ₯1,060,000,000

Winter:  ₯0

Total:  ₯1,060,000,000

Pre-season and friendlies

Alpha Ethniki

League table

Results summary

Results by Matchday

Fixtures

Greek Cup

UEFA Cup

Second qualifying round

First round

Statistics

Squad statistics

! colspan="11" style="background:#FFDE00; text-align:center" | Goalkeepers
|-

! colspan="11" style="background:#FFDE00; color:black; text-align:center;"| Defenders
|-

! colspan="11" style="background:#FFDE00; color:black; text-align:center;"| Midfielders
|-

! colspan="11" style="background:#FFDE00; color:black; text-align:center;"| Forwards
|-

! colspan="11" style="background:#FFDE00; color:black; text-align:center;"| Left during Winter Transfer Window
|-

|-
|}

Disciplinary record

|-
! colspan="17" style="background:#FFDE00; text-align:center" | Goalkeepers

|-
! colspan="17" style="background:#FFDE00; color:black; text-align:center;"| Defenders

|-
! colspan="17" style="background:#FFDE00; color:black; text-align:center;"| Midfielders

|-
! colspan="17" style="background:#FFDE00; color:black; text-align:center;"| Forwards

|-
! colspan="17" style="background:#FFDE00; color:black; text-align:center;"| Left during Winter Transfer window

|-
|}

Starting 11

References

External links
AEK Athens F.C. Official Website

1998-99
Greek football clubs 1998–99 season